Jason Paul Douglas Boyd, better known by his stage name Poo Bear, is an American songwriter, singer, and music producer. He is best known for being one of Justin Bieber's main collaborators, having co-written many of Bieber's hits (including "Despacito (Remix)", "Where Are Ü Now", "What Do You Mean?", "PYD", "Hold Tight" and "All That Matters"), and for co-writing the song "Caught Up" from Usher's diamond-certified album Confessions (2004).

Early years
Boyd was born in Connecticut. He moved with his mother to Atlanta at age 9, after a tornado left them homeless. His first career breakthrough came from working with R&B group 112, for whom he composed the songs "Dance with Me" and "Peaches & Cream".

Career
Following his early success with 112, Boyd continued to write with other artists, including Chris Brown, Jill Scott and Mariah Carey. In 2004, Usher's album Confessions was released, containing the single Caught Up, which Boyd co-wrote with Ryan Toby and producers Dre & Vidal. The album was certified diamond by the RIAA, selling over 10 million copies in the US, and is largely considered s one of the best albums of the decade. "Caught Up" was the fifth single released from the album, peaking at number 8 on the Billboard Hot 100.

While in Las Vegas in January 2013, Boyd was introduced to Justin Bieber through rapper Lil Twist and other friends of Bieber's. The two bonded over similar upbringings and tastes in music, and traveled the world together while working on music for Bieber's album. During this time, Boyd eschewed working with other artists, devoting his time exclusively to Bieber. He co-wrote the majority of the songs on Bieber's albums Journals and Purpose, including "No Pressure" (where he is also credited as producer), "PYD", "All That Matters", and the double-platinum selling singles "Where Are Ü Now" (No. 8 Billboard Hot 100) and "What Do You Mean?" (No. 1 Billboard Hot 100). On April 27, 2018, Boyd released his debut studio album Poo Bear Presents Bearthday Music via Capitol Records.

In the latter part of the 2010s, Boyd's work found success in both the Latin and Country music genres. "Despacito (Remix)" was named the #1 Latin song in the history of the Billboard charts, and Dan + Shay's hit "10,000 Hours" reached #1 on the Billboard Hot Country Songs Chart.

In addition, Boyd produced the songs "Mañana es Too Late" and "Lo Nuestro es Más", by Mexican pop duo Jesse & Joy, with the first one being a collaboration with Colombian reggaeton singer J Balvin.

Discography

Studio albums

Singles

As lead artist

As featured artist

Other charted songs

Guest appearances

Filmography

Songwriting and production credits

References

Living people
American male songwriters
Record producers from Connecticut
Songwriters from Connecticut
African-American songwriters
21st-century African-American people
20th-century African-American people
Year of birth missing (living people)